The Royal Norwegian Ministry of Trade and Industry (Norwegian: Nærings- og handelsdepartementet) was a Norwegian ministry responsible for business, trade and industry. On 1 January 2014 it was merged into Ministry of Trade, Industry and Fisheries. From 2013 it was led by Monica Mæland (Conservative Party), who continued as minister of trade, industry and fisheries from 2014 to 2018.

History
The Norwegian Ministry of Trade, Shipping, Industry, Craft and Fisheries was created on 1 October 1916. After this, the ministry underwent several name changes: to Ministry of Trade, Shipping and Industry on 1 July 1946, to Ministry of Industry, Craft and Shipping on 6 December 1947, to Ministry of Industry and Craft on 1 January 1955, to Ministry of Industry 1 January 1988, to Ministry of Industry and Energy on 1 January 1993 and to Ministry of Trade and Industry on 1 January 1997.

Organisation
The Ministry of Trade and Industry has six departments. The Press and Communications Division is part of the Secretary General's staff.

The Ministry is headed by the Minister of Trade and Industry. The other political staff consists of three State Secretaries and one Political Advisor.

The ministry is divided into the following sections:
 Political staff
 Information section
 Department of Planning, Administration and Economic affairs
 Department of Ownership
 Department of Trade and Industrial Economics
 Department of Research and Innovation Politics
 Department of Regulations and Shipping
 Department of Entrepreneurship and Internationalization

Political staff
 Minister Monica Mæland (Conservative)
 State Secretary Eirik Lae Solberg (Conservative)
 State Secretary Dilek Ayhan (Conservative)

Subsidiaries
Subordinate government agencies:
 Brønnøysund Register Centre
 Guarantee Institute for Export Credits
 Norwegian Accreditation
 Norwegian Directorate of Mining with the Commissioner of Mines at Svalbard
 Norwegian Maritime Directorate
 Norwegian Metrology Service
 Norwegian Geological Survey
 Norwegian Patent Office
 Norwegian Ship Registers
 Norwegian Space Centre

Other agencies associated with the department:
 BEDIN
 Euro Info Centre
 Industrial Development Corporation of Norway
 Innovation Norway
 Master Craftsman Committee
 Norwegian Design Council
 Norwegian Export Credit Agency
 The Research Council of Norway
 Standards Norway

Wholly owned limited companies:
 Argentum Fondsinvesteringer
 BaneTele
 Bjørnøen
 Electronic Chart Centre
 Entra Eiendom
 Flytoget
 Innovation Norway
 Kings Bay
 Mesta
 Industrial Development Corporation of Norway
 Statkraft
 Venturefondet
 Store Norske Spitsbergen Kulkompani

Partially owned public limited companies:
 Telenor (54,0%)
 Kongsberg Gruppen (50,0%)
 Nammo (50,0%)
 Norsk Hydro (43,8%)
 Cermaq (43,5%)
 Yara International (36,2%)
 DnB NOR (34,0%)
 Aker Holding (30.0%, and thus indirectly 12% of Aker Kværner)
 Eksportfinans (15,0%)
 SAS Group (14,3%)

List of ministers

Key

Ministers of Trade (1903–1945)

Ministers of Industry (1945–1987)

Ministers of Industry (1988–1993)

Ministers of Industry and Energy (1993–1996)

Ministers of Trade and Industry (1997–present)

References

Notes

External links
 

 
Trade and Industry
Norway
Norway